Paul Wernle (1 May 1872 – 11 April 1939) was a Swiss theologian, born in Hottingen, today part of the city of Zürich.

He studied at the Universities of Basel, Berlin and Göttingen. At Basel he was a student of Bernhard Duhm (1847-1928), and in Göttingen was influenced by Wilhelm Bousset (1865-1920). In 1900 he became an associate professor at Basel, where in 1905 he was appointed a full professor of New Testament Studies. During the course of his career he also taught classes in dogmatics and church history.

Wernle was a representative of the Religionsgeschichtliche Schule (history of religions school). His expertise was in the field of New Testament analysis, and he is largely remembered for his work involving Synoptic and Pauline research.

He died in Basel.

Selected publications 
 Paulus als Heidenmissionar (Paul as Missionary to the Gentiles), 1899
 Die Anfänge unserer Religion (Beginnings of Our Religion), 1901
 Die Quellen des Lebens Jesu. Mohr (The Sources of the Life of Jesus), 1906
 Lessing und das Christentum (Lessing and Christianity), 1912
 Der schweizerische Protestantismus im 18. Jahrhundert, 1923-1925
 Der schweizerische Protestantismus in der Zeit der Helvetik 1798-1803 (Swiss Protestantism in the Years 1798-1803), 1938–42

References 
 Hermann Goebel (ed.): Mitgliederverzeichnis des Schwarzburgbundes. 8th ed., Frankfurt am Main 1930, p. 148 No. 3482.

Swiss Protestant theologians
People from Zürich
Academic staff of the University of Basel
1872 births
1939 deaths
History of religions school